Planchonella contermina is a species of plant in the family Sapotaceae. It is endemic to New Caledonia.

References

contermina
Endemic flora of New Caledonia
Endangered plants
Taxonomy articles created by Polbot